Meander Valley Council is a local government body in northern Tasmania. It covers the western outskirts of Launceston, and further westward along the Meander River. Meander Valley Council is classified as a rural local government area and has a population of 19,713. Major towns and localities of the region include Elizabeth Town, Mole Creek, Westbury and the principal town of Deloraine.

History and attributes
On 2 April 1993, the municipalities of Deloraine and Westbury were amalgamated to form the Meander Valley Council. Meander Valley is classified as rural, agricultural and very large under the Australian Classification of Local Governments.

Localities
The municipality includes the localities of Bracknell, Carrick, Chudleigh, Hagley, Meander, Mole Creek, Westbury, Elizabeth Town, Caveside, Exton and Travellers Rest. It also includes the outer western suburbs of Launceston including Blackstone Heights and Prospect Vale, and the satellite town of Hadspen.

A majority of the Great Western Tiers mountain range is within the Meander Valley municipal area.

Localities and suburbs
List of localities and suburbs.

Missing from the above list
 Central Plateau
 Dairy Plains
 Frankford
 Lake St Clair
 Middlesex
 Mount Roland
 Riverside
 Sassafras
 Walls of Jerusalem
 Weetah

See also
List of local government areas of Tasmania

References

External links

Meander Valley Council - official website
Local Government Association Tasmania
Tasmanian Electoral Commission - local government

Local government areas of Tasmania
Central Highlands (Tasmania)
Meander Valley Council